= Dominica–Trinidad and Tobago relations =

Dominica-Trinidad and Tobago relations
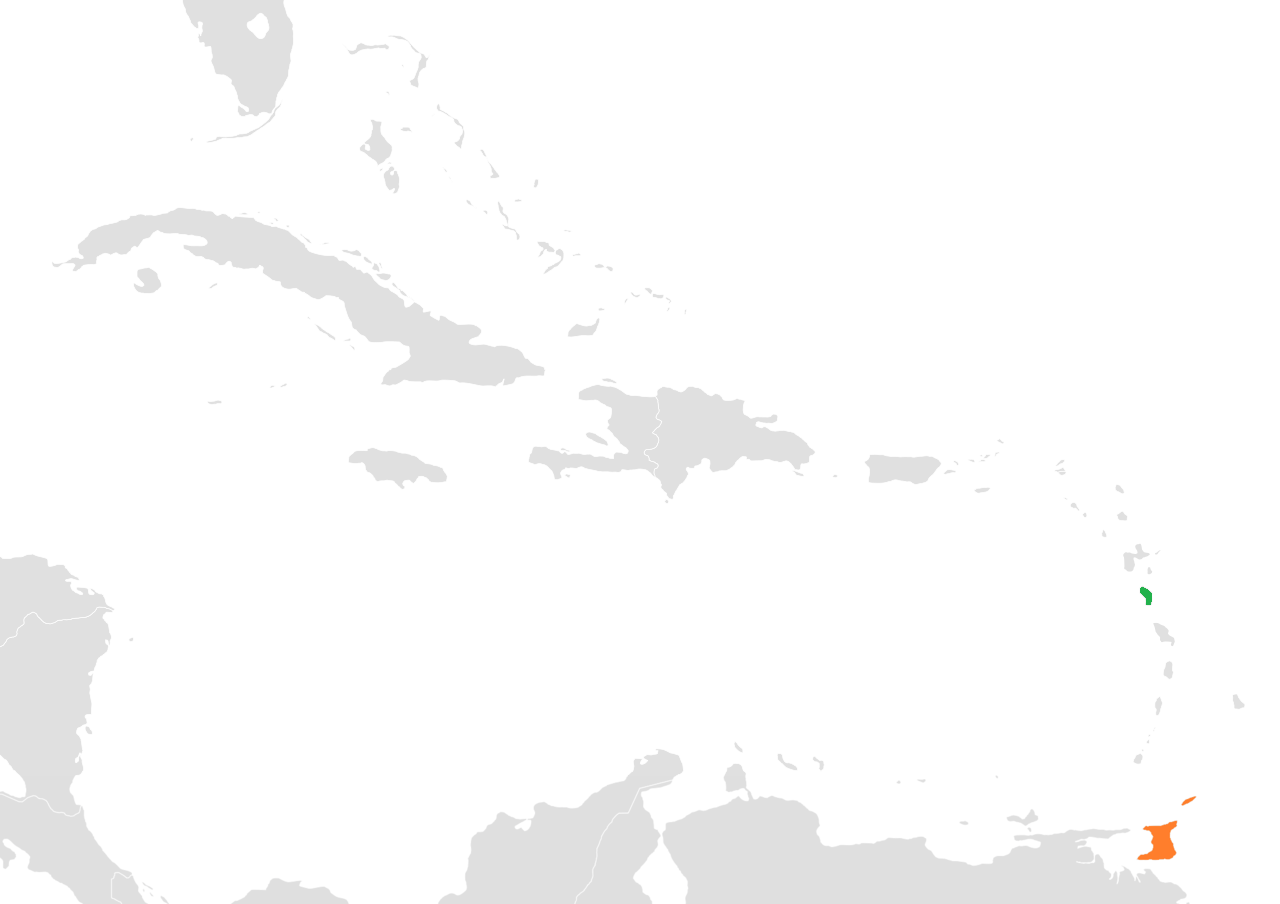

- Dominica: Trinidad and Tobago

Dominica–Trinidad and Tobago relations refers to the bilateral relations between Dominica and Trinidad and Tobago. The two nations have diplomatic relations through Trinidad and Tobago's consulate in Roseau. Both nations are a member of Organization of American States and CARICOM.

== History ==
Dominica in 2017 was devastated by Hurricane Maria and Hurricane Irma, with an estimated death toll of 65. The two hurricanes cost Dominica over 900 Million Dollars in damages. In 2018, Dominica requested a waiver on membership fees for OAS, $25,000, due to the damage from the hurricane season of 2017. Trinidad and Tobago's delegation to OAS rejected Dominica's request for a waiver, the only country at OAS to reject it, severely destroying ties between the two island nations.
